Alain Hermitte (born 27 May 1949) is a French former freestyle swimmer. He competed in two events at the 1972 Summer Olympics.

References

External links
 

1949 births
Living people
French male freestyle swimmers
Olympic swimmers of France
Swimmers at the 1972 Summer Olympics
Place of birth missing (living people)